Spaceland Presents: At the Echo October 6, 2006 is the first live album by New York-based shoegaze band Asobi Seksu. It was recorded at The Echo in Los Angeles, California. It contains mostly material from the Citrus album, plus two songs from their self-titled debut and a cover of a song by The Crystals.

In 2007, it was reissued by KUFALA Recordings.

Track listing
All songs written by Asobi Seksu, except where noted.

 "Intro" – 1:31
 "New Years" – 3:06
 "Strawberries" – 3:33
 "Pink Cloud Tracing Paper" – 3:45
 "Strings" – 4:56
 "Nefi + Girly" – 4:45
 "Sooner" – 3:29
 "Thursday" – 4:32
 "Goodbye" – 4:03
 "I'm Happy But You Don't Like Me" – 2:58
 "Red Sea" – 7:49
 "Then He Kissed Me" (Phil Spector, Jeff Barry, Ellie Greenwich) – 3:01

References

External links
Band page at Friendly Fire Recordings' website
Band page at Spaceland Recordings' website

Asobi Seksu albums
2006 live albums